Conessine is a steroidal alkaloid found in a number of plant species from the family Apocynaceae, including Holarrhena floribunda, Holarrhena antidysenterica and Funtumia elastica. It acts as a histamine antagonist, selective for the H3 subtype (with an affinity of pKi = 8.27; Ki = ~5 nM). It was also found to have long CNS clearance times, high blood–brain barrier penetration and high affinity for the adrenergic receptors.

References 

Alkaloids found in Apocynaceae
H3 receptor antagonists
Steroidal alkaloids